The Dennisville Historic District is a  national historic district in the Dennisville section of Dennis Township in Cape May County, New Jersey. The district is bounded by Petersburg Road, Main Street, Church Road, Hall Avenue, Fidler and Academy Roads, and Route 47. It was added to the National Register of Historic Places on November 24, 1987, for its significance in architecture, industry and maritime history. The district includes 58 contributing buildings.

History
Dennisville, originally named Dennis Creek, was founded in 1726.  The buildings in the district are classified into three periods: 1750–1810, accounting for about 12% of the extent buildings; 1811–1870, accounting for the majority of buildings; and 1871–1899, accounting for about 25% of the buildings.

Education
As with other parts of Dennis Township, the area is zoned to Dennis Township Public Schools (for grades K-8) and Middle Township Public Schools (for high school). The latter operates Middle Township High School.

Countywide schools include Cape May County Technical High School and Cape May County Special Services School District.

See also
National Register of Historic Places listings in Cape May County, New Jersey

References

External links

Dennis Township, New Jersey
Historic districts on the National Register of Historic Places in New Jersey
Houses on the National Register of Historic Places in New Jersey
Queen Anne architecture in New Jersey
Gothic Revival architecture in New Jersey
Geography of Cape May County, New Jersey
National Register of Historic Places in Cape May County, New Jersey
Houses in Cape May County, New Jersey
New Jersey Register of Historic Places